Neo-fascism is a post-World War II far-right ideology that includes significant elements of fascism. Neo-fascism usually includes ultranationalism, racial supremacy, populism, authoritarianism, nativism, xenophobia, and anti-immigration sentiment, as well as opposition to liberal democracy, social democracy, parliamentarianism, liberalism, Marxism, neoliberalism, communism, and socialism. As with classical fascism, it proposes a Third Position as an alternative to market capitalism.

Allegations that a group is neo-fascist may be hotly contested, especially when the term is used as a political epithet. Some post–World War II regimes have been described as neo-fascist due to their authoritarian nature, and sometimes due to their fascination with and sympathy towards fascist ideology and rituals.

History 

According to Jean-Yves Camus and Nicolas Lebourg, the neo-fascist ideology emerged in 1942, after Nazi Germany invaded the USSR and decided to reorient its propaganda on a Europeanist ground. Europe then became both the myth and the utopia of the neo-fascists, who abandoned previous theories of racial inequalities within the white race to share a common euro-nationalist stance after World War II, embodied in Oswald Mosley's Europe a Nation policy. The following chronology can therefore be delineated: an ideological gestation before 1919; the historical experience of fascism between 1919 and 1942, unfolded in several phases; and finally neo-fascism from 1942 onward.

Drawing inspiration from the Italian Social Republic, institutional neo-fascism took the form of the Italian Social Movement (MSI). It became one of the chief reference points for the European far-right until the late 1980s, and "the best (and only) example of a Neofascist party", in the words of political scientist Cas Mudde. At the initiative of the MSI, the European Social Movement was established in 1951 as a pan-European organization of like-minded neo-fascist groups and figures such as the Francoist Falange, Maurice Bardèche, Per Engdahl, and Oswald Mosley. Other organizations like Jeune Nation called in the late 1950s for an extra-parliamentarian insurrection against the regime in what extents to a remnant of pre-war fascist strategies. The main driving force of neo-fascist movements was what they saw as the defense of a Western civilization from the rise of both communism and the Third World, in some cases the loss of the colonial empire.

In 1961, Bardèche redefined the nature of fascism in a book deemed influential in the European far-right at large entitled  (What Is Fascism?). He argued that previous fascists had essentially made two mistakes in that they focused their efforts on the methods rather than the original "idea"; and they wrongly believed that fascist society could be achieved via the nation-state as opposed to the construction of Europe. According to him, fascism could survive the 20th century in a new metapolitical guise if its theorists succeed in building inventive methods adapted to the changes of their times; the aim being the promotion of the core politico-cultural fascist project rather than vain attempts to revive doomed regimes: In addition, Bardèche wrote: "The single party, the secret police, the public displays of Caesarism, even the presence of a Führer are not necessarily attributes of fascism. ... The famous fascist methods are constantly revised and will continue to be revised. More important than the mechanism is the idea which fascism has created for itself of man and freedom. ... With another name, another face, and with nothing which betrays the projection from the past, with the form of a child we do not recognize and the head of a young Medusa, the Order of Sparta will be reborn: and paradoxically it will, without doubt, be the last bastion of Freedom and the sweetness of living.

In the spirit of Bardèche's strategy of disguise through framework change, the MSI had developed a policy of inserimento (insertion, entryism), which relied on gaining political acceptance via the cooperation with other parties within the democratic system. In the political context of the Cold War, anti-communism began to replace anti-fascism as the dominant trend in liberal democracies. In Italy, the MSI became a support group in parliament for the Christian Democratic government in the late 1950s–early 1960s, but was forced back into "political ghetto" after anti-fascist protests and violent street clashes occurred between radical leftist and far-right groups, leading to the demise of the short-lived fascist-backed Tambroni Cabinet in July 1960.

According to psychologist David Pavón-Cuéllar of the Universidad Michoacana de San Nicolás de Hidalgo, the emergence of neoliberalism in the late-twentieth century prompted neoliberalist politicians to utilize neo-fascism by authoritatively removing all limits to capital (including labor laws, social rights and tariffs), through the aestheticization of politics and by using the narcissism of small differences to find a target for hate to exploit in order to maintain a social hierarchy instead of protecting all individuals.

Causes and description 
A number of historians and political scientists have pointed out that the situations in a number of European countries in the 1980s and 1990s, in particular France, Germany and Italy, were in some significant ways analogous to the conditions in Europe in the period between World War I and World War II that gave rise to fascism in its many national guises. Constant economic crises including high unemployment, a resurgence of nationalism, an increase in ethnic conflicts, and the geo-political weakness of national regimes were all present, and while not an exact one-to-one correspondence, circumstances were similar enough to promote the beginning of neo-fascism as a new fascist movement. Because intense nationalism is almost always a part of neo-fascism, the parties which make up this movement are not pan-European, but are specific to each country they arise in; other than this, the neo-fascist parties and other groups have many ideological traits in common.

While certainly fascistic in nature, it is claimed by some that there are differences between neo-fascism and what can be called "historical fascism", or the kind of neo-fascism which came about in the immediate aftermath of World War II. Some historians claim that contemporary neo-fascist parties are not anti-democratic because they operate within their country's political system. Whether that is a significant difference between neo-fascism and historical fascism is doubted by other scholars, who point out that Hitler worked within the existing political system of the Weimar Republic to obtain power, although it took an anti-democratic but constitutional process in the form of presidential appointment rather than election through the Reichstag. Others point to the current neo-fascists not being totalitarian in nature, but the organization of their parties along the lines of the Führerprinzip would seem to indicate otherwise. Historian Stanley G. Payne claims that the differences in current circumstance to that of the interwar years, and the strengthening of democracy in European countries since the end of the war prevents a general return of historical fascism, and causes true neo-fascist groups to be small and remain on the fringe. For Payne, groups like the National Front in France are not neo-fascists in nature, but are merely "right radical parties" that will, in the course of time, moderate their positions in order to achieve electoral victory.

The problem of immigrants, both legal and illegal or irregular, whether called "foreigners", "foreign workers", "economic refugees", "ethnic minorities", "asylum seekers", or "aliens", is a core neo-fascist issue, intimately tied to their nativism, ultranationalism, and xenophobia, but the specifics differ somewhat from country to country due to prevailing circumstances. In general, the anti-immigrant impetus is strong when the economy is weak or unemployment is high, and people fear that outsiders are taking their jobs. Because of this, neo-Fascist parties have more electoral traction during hard economic times. Again, this mirrors the situation in the interwar years, when, for instance, Germany suffered from incredible hyperinflation and many people had their life savings swept away. In contemporary Europe, mainstream political parties see the electoral advantage the neo-fascist and far-right parties get from their strong emphasis on the supposed problem of the outsider, and are then tempted to co-opt the issue by moving somewhat to the right on the immigrant issue, hoping to slough off some voters from the hard right. In the absence in post-war Europe of a strong socialist movement, this has the tendency to move the political centre to the right overall.

While both historical fascism and contemporary neo-fascism are xenophobic, nativist and anti-immigrant, neo-fascist leaders are careful not to present these views in so strong a manner as to draw obvious parallels to historical events. Both Jean-Marie Le Pen of France's National Front and Jörg Haider's Freedom Party of Austria, in the words of historian Tony Judt, "revealed [their] prejudices only indirectly". Jews would not be castigated as a group, but a person would be specifically named as a danger who just happened to be a Jew. The public presentation of their leaders is one principal difference between the neo-Fascists and historical Fascists: their programs have been "finely honed and 'modernized'" to appeal to the electorate, a "'far-right ideology with a democratic veneer'". Modern neo-fascists do not appear in "jackboots and brownshirts", but in suits and ties. The choice is deliberate, as the leaders of the various groups work to differentiate themselves from the brutish leaders of historical fascism and also to hide whatever bloodlines and connections tie the current leaders to the historical Fascist movements. When these become public, as they did in the case of Haider, it can lead to their decline and fall.

International networks 
In 1951, the New European Order (NEO) neo-fascist European-wide alliance was set up to promote pan-European nationalism. It was a more radical splinter group of the European Social Movement. The NEO had its origins in the 1951 Malmö conference when a group of rebels led by René Binet and Maurice Bardèche refused to join the European Social Movement as they felt that it did not go far enough in terms of racialism and anti-communism. As a result, Binet joined with Gaston-Armand Amaudruz in a second meeting that same year in Zurich to set up a second group pledged to wage war on communists and non-white people.

Several Cold War regimes and international neo-fascist movements collaborated in operations such as assassinations and false flag bombings. Stefano Delle Chiaie, who was involved in Italy's Years of Lead, took part in Operation Condor; organizing the 1976 assassination attempt on Chilean Christian Democrat Bernardo Leighton. Vincenzo Vinciguerra escaped to Franquist Spain with the help of the SISMI, following the 1972 Peteano attack, for which he was sentenced to life. Along with Delle Chiaie, Vinciguerra testified in Rome in December 1995 before judge María Servini de Cubría, stating that Enrique Arancibia Clavel (a former Chilean secret police agent prosecuted for crimes against humanity in 2004) and US expatriate DINA agent Michael Townley were directly involved in General Carlos Prats' assassination. Michael Townley was sentenced in Italy to 15 years of prison for having served as intermediary between the DINA and the Italian neo-fascists.

The regimes of Francoist Spain, Augusto Pinochet's Chile and Alfredo Stroessner's Paraguay participated together in Operation Condor, which targeted political opponents worldwide. During the Cold War, these international operations gave rise to some cooperation between various neo-fascist elements engaged in a "Crusade against Communism". Anti-Fidel Castro terrorist Luis Posada Carriles was condemned for the Cubana Flight 455 bombing on 6 October 1976. According to the Miami Herald, this bombing was decided on at the same meeting during which it was decided to target Chilean former minister Orlando Letelier, who was assassinated on 21 September 1976. Carriles wrote in his autobiography that "we the Cubans didn't oppose ourselves to an isolated tyranny, nor to a particular system of our fatherland, but that we had in front of us a colossal enemy, whose main head was in Moscow, with its tentacles dangerously extended on all the planet."

Europe

Finland 
In Finland, neo-fascism is often connected to the 1930s and 1940s fascist and pro-Nazi Patriotic People's Movement (IKL), its youth movement Blues-and-Blacks and its predecessor Lapua Movement. Post-war fascist groups such as Patriotic People's Movement (1993), Patriotic People's Front, Patriotic National Movement, Blue-and-Black Movement and many others consciously copy the style of the movement and look up to its leaders as inspiration. A Finns Party councillor and police officer in Seinäjoki caused small scandal wearing the fascist blue-and-black uniform.

Italy 

Italy was broadly divided into two political blocs following World War II, the Christian Democrats, who remained in power until the 1990s, and the Italian Communist Party (PCI), which was very strong immediately after the war and achieved a large consensus during the 1970s. With the beginning of the Cold War, the American and British governments turned a blind eye to the refusal of Italian authorities to honor requested extraditions of Italian war criminals to Yugoslavia, which they feared would benefit the PCI. With no event such as the Nuremberg trials taking place for Italian war crimes, the collective memory of the crimes committed by Italian fascists was excluded from public media, from textbooks in Italian schools, and even from the academic discourse on the Western side of the Iron Curtain throughout the Cold War. The PCI was expelled from power in May 1947, a month before the Paris Conference on the Marshall Plan, along with the French Communist Party (PCF).

In 1946, a group of Italian fascist soldiers founded the Italian Social Movement (MSI) to continue advocating the ideas of Benito Mussolini. The leader of the MSI was Giorgio Almirante, who remained at the head of the party until his death in 1988. Despite attempts in the 1970s towards a "historic compromise" between the PCI and the DC, the PCI did not have a role in executive power until the 1980s. In December 1970, Junio Valerio Borghese attempted, along with Stefano Delle Chiaie, the Borghese Coup which was supposed to install a neo-fascist regime. Neo-fascist groups took part in various false flag terrorist attacks, starting with the December 1969 Piazza Fontana massacre, for which Vincenzo Vinciguerra was convicted, and they are usually considered to have stopped with the 1980 Bologna railway bombing.

In 1987, the reins of the MSI party were taken by Gianfranco Fini, under whom in 1995 it was dissolved and transformed into the National Alliance (AN). The party led by Fini distanced itself from Mussolini and fascism and made efforts to improve its relations with the Jewish community, becoming a conservative right-wing party until its merger with Silvio Berlusconi's Forza Italia into the centre-right party The People of Freedom in 2009. Neo-fascist parties in Italy include the Tricolour Flame (Fiamma Tricolore), the New Force (Forza Nuova), the National Social Front (Fronte Sociale Nazionale), and CasaPound. The national-conservative Brothers of Italy (FdI), main heirs of MSI and AN, has been described as neo-fascist by several academics, and it has some neo-fascist factions within their internal organization. The results of the 2022 Italian general election, in which FdI became the first party, have been variously described as Italy's first far-right-led government in the republican era and its most right-wing government since World War II.

Greece 

After the onset of the Great Recession and economic crisis in Greece, a movement known as the Golden Dawn, widely considered a neo-Nazi party, soared in support out of obscurity and won seats in Greece's parliament, espousing a staunch hostility towards minorities, illegal immigrants and refugees. In 2013, after the murder of an anti-fascist musician by a person with links to Golden Dawn, the Greek government ordered the arrest of Golden Dawn's leader Nikolaos Michaloliakos and other Golden Dawn members on charges related to being associated with a criminal organization. In October, 2020, the court declared Golden Dawn to be a criminal organization, convicting 68 members of various crimes including murder. However, far-right politics continue to be strong in Greece, such as Ilias Kasidiaris' Greeks for the Fatherland, an Ultranationalist party. In 2021, Greek neo-Nazi youth attacked a rival group at a school in Greece.

Portugal 
After the fall of authoritarianism in Portugal after the Carnation Revolution of 1974, several neo-fascist groups arose such as the New Order (Portugal) which was created in 1978. A report by the European Parliament defined the ideology of the New Order as revolutionary fascist and hyper-nationalist. The group also had connections to Fuerza Nueva in Spain. The New Order was disbanded in 1982, however its activities continued to as late as 1985.

Romania 

In Romania, the ultra-nationalist movement which allied itself with the Axis powers and German National Socialism was the Iron Guard, also known as the Legion of the Archangel Michael. There are some modern political organisations which consider themselves heirs of Legionarism, this includes Noua Dreaptă and the Everything For the Country Party, founded by former Iron Guard members. The latter organisation was outlawed in 2015. Aside, from these Romanian organisations, the Sixty-Four Counties Youth Movement representing ultra-nationalism from the Hungarian minority is also present, especially in Transylvania. Other nationalistic and irredentist groups such as the Greater Romania Party do not originate from Legionarism, but in fact grew out of national communist tendencies from the era of Nicolae Ceaușescu (the party was founded by his "court poet" Corneliu Vadim Tudor).

Russia 

In 1990, Vladimir Zhirinovsky founded the Liberal Democratic Party of Russia. Its leader opposes democratic values, the rights of man, a multiparty system, and the rule of law. Encyclopedia Britannica considers Zhirinovsky to be a neo-fascist. Zhirinovsky endorsed the forcible re-occupation of Lithuania, Latvia, and Estonia, and suggested nuclear waste should be dumped there. During the First Chechen War in the mid-1990s, he advocated hitting some Chechen villages with tactical nuclear weapons.

The Russian National Unity was a paramilitary organization which was founded by Alexander Barkashov in 1990. It used a left-pointed swastika and emphasizes the "primary importance" of Russian blood. Concerning Adolf Hitler, the organizations's leader Barkashov declared: "I consider [Hitler] a great hero of the German nation and of all white races. He succeeded in inspiring the entire nation to fight against degradation and the washing away of national values." Before it was banned in 1999, and breakup in late 2000, the group estimated to have had approximately 20,000 to 25,000 members. Alexander Barkashov along with other members of the Russian National Unity have engaged in religious activities and pro-Russian activism in the Russian-Ukrainian War.

Slovakia 
Kotleba – People's Party Our Slovakia is a far-right political party with views that are considered extremist and fascist. The Party's leader, Marian Kotleba, is a former neo-Nazi, who once wore a uniform modelled on that of the Hlinka Guard, the militia of the 1939–45 Nazi-sponsored Slovak State. He opposes Romani people, immigrants, the Slovak National Uprising, NATO, the United States, and the European Union. The party also endorses the clerical fascist war criminal and former Slovak President Jozef Tiso.

In 2003, Kotleba founded the far-right political party Slovak Community (Slovak: Slovenská Pospolitosť). In 2007, the Slovak interior ministry banned the party from running and campaigning in elections. In spite of this ban, Kotleba's party got 8.04% of votes in the Slovak 2016 parliamentary elections. As of December 2022, voter support has dropped significantly to about 3.1%, under the 5% threshold required to enter parliament.

Turkey 

Grey Wolves is a Turkish ultranationalist and neo-fascist youth organization. It is the "unofficial militant arm" of the Nationalist Movement Party. The Grey Wolves have been accused of terrorism. According to Turkish authorities, the organization carried out 694 murders during the late-1970s political violence in Turkey, between 1974 and 1980.

The nationalist political party MHP founded by Alparslan Türkeş is also sometimes described as neo-fascist.

United Kingdom 
The British National Party (BNP) is a nationalist party in the United Kingdom which espoused the ideology of fascism and anti-immigration. In the 2009 European elections, it gained two members of the European Parliament (MEPs), including former party leader Nick Griffin. Other British organisations described as fascist or neo-fascist include the National Front, Combat 18, the English Defence League, and Britain First.

Americas

United States 

Groups which are identified as neo-fascist in the United States generally include neo-Nazi organizations and movements such as the Proud Boys, the National Alliance, and the American Nazi Party. The Institute for Historical Review publishes negationist historical papers which are often of an antisemitic nature. The alt-right—a loosely connected coalition of individuals and organizations which advocates a wide range of far-right ideas, from neoreactionaries to white nationalists—is often included under the umbrella term "neo-fascist", because alt-right individuals and organizations advocate a radical form of authoritarian ultranationalism.

Brazil 

The Brazilian government of Jair Bolsonaro is cited as the rising point of neo-fascism in South America in the 21st century, based on the denial of science, bellicose rhetoric and authoritarian measures that withdraw rights from the population linked to a strongly neoliberal economic policy. As a result of factors such as opposition to Workers' Party, fear and reaction to the 2013 insurgency, as well as the economic crises of 2008 and 2014, Jair Bolsonaro emerged as a viable option, not because of a well-defined strategic project, but almost accidentally. In this way, the multiplicity of groups that make up the Bolsonarism, the different wings (military, ideological, religious, capital, etc.) present pragmatic disagreements, strategies, objectives and distinct methods. The core of this Brazilian neo-fascism converged its interests and rhetoric with Pentecostal religious fundamentalism and both allied themselves with military sectors and liberal think tanks, so that within bolsonarism there is a power bloc made up of non-fascist conservatives and far-right neo-fascists; although still without the support of the broad and fanatical mass movement which was the basis of European fascism.

Bolivia 

The Bolivian Socialist Falange party founded in 1937 played a crucial role in mid-century Bolivian politics. Luis García Meza Tejada's regime took power during the 1980 Cocaine Coup in Bolivia with the help of Italian neo-fascist Stefano Delle Chiaie, Nazi war criminal Klaus Barbie and the Buenos Aires junta. That regime has been accused of neo-fascist tendencies and of admiration for Nazi paraphernalia and rituals. Hugo Banzer Suárez, who preceded Tejada, also displayed admiration for Nazism and fascism.

Oceania

Australia and New Zealand 
Brenton Harrison Tarrant, the Australian perpetrator of the Christchurch mosque shootings at Al Noor Mosque and Linwood Islamic Centre in Christchurch, New Zealand, was an admitted fascist who followed eco-fascism and admired Oswald Mosley, the leader of the British fascist organization British Union of Fascists (BUF), who is quoted in the shooter's manifesto The Great Replacement (named after the French far-right theory of the same name).

Africa

Asia

India

Japan 

After World War II, neo-fascism and ultra-nationalism were ostracized from mainstream politics in Germany, while in Japan, they were partially related to major right-wing conservative politics. Since 2006, all prime ministers of Japan's LDP have been members of far-right ultranationalist Nippon Kaigi.

Mongolia 
With Mongolia located between the larger nations Russia and China, ethnic insecurities have driven many Mongolians to neo-fascism, expressing nationalism centered around Genghis Khan and Adolf Hitler. Groups advocating these ideologies include Blue Mongolia, Dayar Mongol, and Mongolian National Union.

Pakistan

Pakistan's Tehreek-e-Labbaik Pakistan is considered fascist by some analysts because of its engagement in Islamic extremism.

Taiwan 

The National Socialism Association (NSA) is a neo-fascist political organization founded in Taiwan in September 2006 by Hsu Na-chi (許娜琦), a 22-year-old female political science graduate of Soochow University. The NSA views Adolf Hitler as its leader and often uses the slogan "Long live Hitler". This has brought them condemnation from the Simon Wiesenthal Center, an international Jewish human rights centre.

Indonesia 
Adolf Hitler's propaganda which advocated the hegemony of "Greater Germany" inspired similar ideas of "Indonesia Mulia" (esteemed Indonesia) and "Indonesia Raya" (great Indonesia) in the former Dutch colony. The first fascist party was the Partai Fasis Indonesia (PFI). Sukarno admired Nazi Germany under Hitler and its vision of happiness for all: "It's in the Third Reich that the Germans will see Germany at the apex above other nations in this world," he said in 1963. He stated that Hitler was 'extraordinarily clever' in 'depicting his ideals': he spoke about Hitler's rhetorical skills, but denied any association with Nazism as an ideology, saying that Indonesian nationalism was not as narrow as Nazi nationalism.

See also 

 Alain de Benoist
 Antisemitism
 Christian fascism
 Christian Identity
 Clerical fascism
 Creativity (religion)
 Far-right politics
 George Lincoln Rockwell
 Hindutva
 Islamofascism
 List of fascist movements
 Ethnic nationalism
 Neo-Nazism
 Netto-uyoku
 Nouvelle Droite
 Palingenetic ultranationalism
 Post-World War II anti-fascism
 Japanese far-right groups
 Right-wing terrorism
 Third Position
 White nationalism
 White supremacy

References

Bibliography 
 Golsan, Richard J. ed. (1998) Fascism's Return: Scandal, Revision and Ideology since 1980. Lincoln, Nebraska: University of Nebraska Press. .
 Judt, Tony (2005) Postwar: A History of Europe Since 1945. New York, Penguin Press. .

Further reading 
 The Beast Reawakens by Martin A. Lee, (New York: Little, Brown and Company, 1997).
 The Dark Side of Europe: The Extreme Right Today by Geoff Harris, (Edinburgh University Press; new edition, 1994).
 The Far Right in Western and Eastern Europe by Luciano Cheles, Ronnie Ferguson, and Michalina Vaughan (Longman Publishing Group; 2nd edition, 1995).
 Fascism (Oxford Readers) by Roger Griffin, 1995, .
 Fascism in Britain: A History, 1918–1985 by Richard C. Thurlow (Olympic Marketing Corp, 1987).
 Fascism Today: A World Survey by Angelo Del Boca (Pantheon Books, 1st American edition, 1969).
 Free to Hate: The Rise of the Right in Post-Communist Eastern Europe by Paul Hockenos (Routledge; Reprint edition, 1994).
 Fascism: Contagion, Community, Myth by Nidesh Lawtoo (Michigan State University Press, 2019.
 Italian Neofascism: The Strategy of Tension and the Politics of Nonreconciliation by Anna Cento Bull (Berghahn Books, 2007).
 Mussolini and the Eclipse of Italian Fascism: From Dictatorship to Populism by R. J. B. Bosworth R. J. (Yale University Press, 2019).
 The Radical Right in Western Europe: A Comparative Analysis by Herbert Kitschelt (University of Michigan Press; reprint edition, 1997).
 The Routledge Companion to Italian Fascist Architecture: Reception and Legacy by Kay Bea Jones and Stephanie Pilat (Routledge, 2020).
 Shadows Over Europe: The Development and Impact of the Extreme Right in Western Europe edited by Martin Schain, Aristide Zolberg, and Patrick Hossay (Palgrave Macmillan; 1st edition, 2002).
 Transnational Neofascism in France and Italy by Andrea Mammone (Cambridge University Press, 2015).

External links 
 
 
 Eternal Fascism: Fourteen Ways of Looking at a Blackshirt, Umberto Eco's list of 14 characteristics of fascism, published in 1995.
 What is Fascism?, some general ideological features by Matthew N. Lyons.
 Fascism by Chip Berlet.

 
Far-right politics
Fascism
Political ideologies
Political theories

de:Rechtsextremismus#Italien